Nankogobinda is a genus of moths of the family Crambidae. It contains only one species, Nankogobinda artificialis, is found in Brazil and Australia.

References

Pyraustinae
Crambidae genera
Monotypic moth genera